San Giovanni degli Eremiti (St John of the Hermits) is an ancient former monastic church located on Via Benedettini #19 in the ancient quarter of Albergaria  of the city of  Palermo, region of Sicily, Italy. It is about two blocks south from the Palazzo dei Normanni, adjacent to the church of San Giorgio in Kemonia. While the interior is virtually devoid of decoration or furnishings, the red Norman-Byzantine domes, the medieval cloister ruins, and garden make this small church a symbol of ancient Palermo.

History

A church and a Benedictine monastery existed at the site date prior to the 6th century. Pope Gregory the Great is said to have patronized its establishment. The seventh-century Pope Agatho took orders at this monastery. It is said that the Saracen conquerors closed or razed the monastery, perhaps converting the church to a mosque. After the  Norman conquest, circa 1136, the site was restored by Roger II of Sicily to Benedictine  Benedictine monks of Saint William of Vercelli . The church was dedicated to St John the Evangelist.

It is not clear why the church gained the tag of Eremiti. While it is possible that it refers to the cloistered Benedictine monks (hermits, from Greek eremìtes, monks), but it could be that the name was derived from the nearby church of San Mercurio, known as Ermes in Greek.

In the 19th century, under the guidance of Giuseppe Patricolo, director of the Royal office for the conservation of monuments of Sicily, the structures were restored aiming for his perspective of their original medieval appearance.

Architecture
The church is notable for its brilliant red domes, which show clearly the persistence of Arab influences in Sicily at the time of its reconstruction in the 12th century, the Arab-Norman culture. In her 1882 Diary of an Idle Woman in Sicily, Frances Elliot described it as "... totally oriental... it would fit well in Baghdad or Damascus". However, the red color of the domes are not original, as they were painted in this color by Patricolo who found pieces of red plaster on the domes and therefore decided to paint all the domes in red.

The church lies with a flank on a square construction. The church is on the Latin Cross plan with a nave and two aisles and three apses. Each of the square spans is surmounted by a dome. The presbytery, ending with a niche, has also a dome.

The cloister, enriched by a luxurious garden, is the best preserved part of the ancient monastery. It has notable small double columns with capitals decorated by vegetable motifs, which support ogival arches. It also includes an Arab cistern.

See also
Arab-Norman Palermo and the Cathedral Churches of Cefalù and Monreale
 History of medieval Arabic and Western European domes

References

12th-century Roman Catholic church buildings in Italy
Giovanni degli Eremiti
Arab-Norman architecture in Palermo
Monasteries in Sicily
Norman architecture in Italy
Churches with Norman architecture
Gothic architecture in Sicily
World Heritage Sites in Italy
Arab-Norman Palermo and the Cathedral Churches of Cefalù and Monreale